Justice Alliance may refer to:

Justice Alliance (Hong Kong), Hong Kong political party
Justice Alliance faction, faction of the Democratic Progressive Party in Taiwan

See also
Alliance for Justice
Justice League (disambiguation)